Crystal Simorgh for Audience Choice of Best Film is an award presented annually by the Fajr International Film Festival held in Iran.

Winners

References 

Awards for best film
Film by Audience Choice